In sumo wrestling, a  is an organization of sumo wrestlers where they train and live. It can also be termed sumo-beya. All wrestlers in professional sumo must belong to one. There are currently 43 heya (as of 2022), each of which belongs to one of five ichimon (groupings of heya). They vary in size, with the largest heya having over thirty wrestlers and smallest just one wrestler. Most heya are based in and around the Ryōgoku district of Tokyo, sumo's traditional heartland, although the high price of land has led to some newer heya being built in other parts of Tokyo or its suburbs.

Most heya have a network of scouts, who may be former wrestlers themselves, friends of the head coach, or supporters of the heya, who keep a look out for any powerful or athletic young men and follow the results of local sumo (and judo) competitions. Most new recruits join at the age of 15 or 16, straight from junior high school.

A wrestler is expected to stay with the heya he joins until the end of his career. There is no transfer system in sumo. The only exceptions are if the coach who originally scouted him leaves to found a new heya, in which case he might be permitted to follow him, or if a heya shuts down due to retirement or death of the stablemaster, mismanagement or financial reasons, the remaining wrestlers are often permitted to transfer to another heya, usually within the same ichimon. Just as with wrestlers, all tokoyama (hairdressers), gyōji (referees), and yobidashi (ushers) are attached to a specific heya where they normally begin and end their careers.

Heya may only be set up by an oyakata or elder of the Japan Sumo Association. A heya is always named after the elder title owned by its head coach. An elder is obligated to retire and pass on ownership of a heya at age 65. When a new oyakata who has not inherited the retiree's elder name takes over a heya, the name of the heya is generally changed to the new owner's elder name to reflect this. Further oyakata may be attached to the stable. In September 2006 the Sumo Association tightened the rules on opening up new stables. Now only oyakata who spent at least 25 tournaments ranked in san'yaku or 60 tournaments in the top makuuchi division may do so. The criteria for inheriting an existing heya are much less strict – the former Kanechika, for example was able to take over Miyagino stable despite having never fought in the top division at all, as only 12 makuuchi or 20 jūryō basho are needed.

A special rule dictates that wrestlers from the same heya never fight each other in a main tournament, except in playoffs for a yūshō or divisional championship. This notably worked to the advantages of brothers Takanohana and Wakanohana in recent years, as although they both achieved the top rank of yokozuna, they never had to fight each other (excepting one playoff bout in 1995) as they both belonged to the Futagoyama stable.

The Japan Sumo Association helps existing heya by providing their stablemasters with at least ¥55,000 ($550) in training payments monthly for each wrestler in the stable that is not in the sekitori ranks. Extra payments are given every two months for high-ranked wrestlers. The financial help for having a yokozuna in its stable yield ¥300,000 ($3,000). In addition, stablemasters receive "support payments", "maintenance payments" and "training operations payments" based largely on the rank and number of the stable's wrestlers. Therefore, large stables receive around ¥100 million ($1 million) per year. This system provides incentives for elders to recruit and train winning wrestlers.

Most heya allow visitors to watch early morning training (keiko) free of charge, although rules vary from stable to stable as to the size of the group and whether advance notice or a Japanese speaker are required.

Pronunciation note
When coming second in a compound word, heya is pronounced beya due to a Japanese phonological tendency called rendaku, e.g. the stable Kokonoe is called Kokonoe-beya and a sumo stable is referred to as "sumo-beya".

See also

List of sumo stables - a list of active heya.
List of sumo elders
Japan Sumo Association
Toshiyori - sumo elder information

References

Japanese martial arts terminology
Sport in Japan
Sumo terminology

fr:Liste des termes japonais spécifiques à la lutte sumo#H